The Swiss National Bike Routes are the national cycling route network of Switzerland. There are currently 9 such long-distance cycling routes criss-crossing the Swiss nation and these were established mainly to promote bicycle tourism.

The routes are signposted with red signposts. National routes are characterized by single-digit numbers to tell them apart from the Swiss regional routes. Each national route is published in a guidebook in German and French with map sections at 1:100 000 scale with technical and tourist information.

Nine national and many regional routes were established. The nine national routes are:
Rhone Route : Andermatt - Geneva, 309 km (26 km unpaved road ), 4360 meters of altitude
Rhine Route : Andermatt - Oberalp Pass - Chur - Schaffhausen - Basel, 424 km
North -South Route : Basel - Chiasso, 363 km
Alpine Panorama Route : St.Margrethen - Aigle, 483 km
Mittelland Route : Roman Horn - Lausanne, 369 km
Graubünden Route : Chur - Bellinzona, 260 km
Jura Route : Basel - Nyon, 275 km
Aare Route : Upper Forest - Koblenz, 305 km
Lakes Route : Montreux - Rorschach, 497 km

Note that, these routes often follow paved roads and paths, but they also contain sections that are not yet paved. Only the Route 4 (Alpine Panorama Route) is paved throughout.

See also
EuroVelo
LF-routes, the national cycling route network of the Netherlands.
National Cycle Network, the national cycling route network of the United Kingdom.

References

External links
National routes Schweiz Mobil - Veloland

Cycling in Switzerland
National cycling route networks
Tourism in Switzerland